Ioannis Santorinaios was a Greek cyclist. He competed in two events at the 1908 Summer Olympics.

References

External links
 

Year of birth missing
Year of death missing
Greek male cyclists
Olympic cyclists of Greece
Cyclists at the 1906 Intercalated Games
Cyclists at the 1908 Summer Olympics
Place of birth missing